The Al-Gaddafi International Prize for Human Rights was an annual human rights prize founded by the Libyan People's Congress in late 1988, in "indebtedness and gratitude for Muammar Gaddafi and in appreciation for his role in firmly establishing the principle of direct democracy, his persistent struggle, his distinctive inspiration and continuous instigation for the consolidation of human liberty and for issuing the Great Green Document in the era of the masses, for the purpose of bestowing tribute upon symbolic figures of struggle and faith in the values of freedom to all humans, nations, groups and individuals".

Gaddafi made an initial grant of ten million US$ to the Swiss-based foundation North-South XXI which later administered the prize donation. The sum of the prize money was US $250,000 (in case of several recipients the prize money was shared). The prize was given by an international committee, chaired by former President of Algeria Ahmed Ben Bella. Gaddafi himself had no say in choosing the winner.

The prize was discontinued in 2011, after Gaddafi's overthrow and death during the Libyan Civil War.

Criticism of the organization includes Swiss TV's report claiming that "the Gaddafi prize for Human Rights is an instrument for propaganda for the dictator...Numerous Holocaust deniers and despots are among the prize winners", while other groups have said that it promotes "anti-American and anti-Western hatred".

List of recipients

Postage stamps issue 
The Libyan state-owned General Posts and Telecommunications Company (GPTC) dedicated a postage stamps issue to Ghadafi Prize for Human Rights in 1994 (date of issue December 31). The issue consists of a minisheet with sixteen stamps.

Each horizontal strip of four stamps is dedicated to a particular subject:
 Nelson Mandela
 Indigenous peoples of the Americas
 Bosnian War
 Intifada in Palestine

References

External links 
 List of recipients of the Al-Gaddafi International Prize for Human Rights AlGaddafi.org

Human rights awards
Muammar Gaddafi
Awards established in 1988
Awards disestablished in 2011
Libyan awards